The 2017–18 Inverness Caledonian Thistle F.C. season is the club's first season in the Scottish Championship, having been relegated from the Scottish Premiership at the end of the 2016–17 season. Thistle will also compete in the Scottish Challenge Cup, Scottish League Cup and the Scottish Cup.

This season has seen the most postponements of any Inverness CT season, with 10 Postponements as of 18 April 2018.

Summary

Management
Following the club's relegation at the end of the previous season manager Richie Foran was sacked by the club during the close season on 29 May 2017. On 14 June 2017, John Robertson was appointed as manager on a two-year contract, leaving his role of Head of Coach Education at Heart of Midlothian. Brian Rice assistant manager to Foran oversaw team affairs prior to Robertson's appointment.

Results and fixtures

Friendlies/Charity Games

Scottish Championship

League Cup

Scottish Challenge Cup

Scottish Cup

Squad statistics
During the 2017–18 season, Inverness Caledonian Thistle have used twenty-four different players in competitive games. The table below shows the number of appearances and goals scored by each player.

Appearances

|}

Overall goalscorers

Hat-tricks

Club statistics

League table

League Cup table

Division summary

Management statistics
Last updated 18 April 2018

Transfers

In

Out

See also
 List of Inverness Caledonian Thistle F.C. seasons

Notes

References

Inverness Caledonian Thistle F.C. seasons
Inverness